Celaenorrhinus dargei is a species of butterfly in the family Hesperiidae. It is found in Cameroon.

References

Endemic fauna of Cameroon
Butterflies described in 1976
dargei